Julia Downes is a songwriter, musician and producer whose songs have appeared on albums by Roger Daltrey, Meat Loaf,  Sheena Easton, John Parr, Saga, and Michael Ball.

In 1983 she released the album Let Sleeping Dogs Lie, which includes her own version of her song "Don't Talk to Strangers", later recorded by Roger Daltrey.

She produced Annabella Lwin's 1986 album Fever and played keyboards on Stephan Eicher's 1998 album Silence.

List of songs written or co-written
"Under a Raging Moon" (by Roger Daltrey on album Under a Raging Moon)
"Don't Talk to Strangers" (by Roger Daltrey on album Under a Raging Moon)
"Don't Leave Your Mark on Me" (by Meat Loaf on album Bad Attitude)
"Don't Leave Your Mark on Me [Mark 2]" (by John Parr on album Running the Endless Mile)
"Story Still Remains the Same [Vices]" (by John Parr on album Running the Endless Mile) 
"Machinery" (by Sheena Easton on album Madness, Money & Music)

References

Women songwriters
English songwriters
English record producers
British women composers
Living people
Year of birth missing (living people)
British women record producers